The Communauté de communes des Trois Rivières is a former intercommunality in the Seine-Maritime département of the Normandy region of north-western France. It was created in January 2002. It was merged into the new Communauté de communes Terroir de Caux in January 2017.

Participants 
The Communauté de communes comprised the following 25 communes:

Auffay
Beauval-en-Caux
Belleville-en-Caux
Bertrimont
Biville-la-Baignarde
Calleville-les-Deux-Églises
Étaimpuis
La Fontelaye
Fresnay-le-Long
Gonneville-sur-Scie
Heugleville-sur-Scie
Imbleville
Montreuil-en-Caux
Saint-Denis-sur-Scie
Saint-Maclou-de-Folleville
Saint-Ouen-du-Breuil
Saint-Vaast-du-Val
Saint-Victor-l'Abbaye
Sévis
Tôtes
Val-de-Saâne
Varneville-Bretteville
Vassonville

See also
Communes of the Seine-Maritime department

References 

Trois Rivieres